Erwin C. Dietrich (4 October 1930 in Glarus – 15 March 2018 in Zurich) was a Swiss film director, producer and actor, often regarded as one of the most influential cinematographers in Switzerland.

Career

He quit his dream of becoming an actor rather early on and instead started focusing on his sense for artistic trends appealing to audiences. Starting in 1955 he began producing movies, first with his company "Urania":  The films The Man in the Black Derby and The Model Husband starring Swiss comedian Walter Roderer turned into big successes. At around the time where the "Edgar Wallace" thrillers became popular in Germany, Erwin brought Nylon Noose and The Strangler of the Tower starring German movie stars, such as Dietmar Schönherr, to the cinemas.

He achieved commercial success with his directorial debut in 1968, the film adaptation of Guy de Maupassant's novel The Colonel's Nieces. Over 45 more films followed until 1980. Movies that he either directed or produced, often using pseudonyms such "Michael Thomas" or "Manfred Gregor" under the umbrella of newly "Elite-Film" (later: "Ascot Film GmbH"). Most of these movies came to life in a very informal environment, with a small crew in his studios in Rümlang, where the set pieces were rearranged on the fly. Some highlights can be found, in particular those starring Ingrid Steeger or French erotic star number one, Brigitte Lahaie. These movies have meanwhile advanced to cult status and are long running favorites at movie festivals and in home cinemas worldwide. Erwin often mentioned his favorite movie to be his remake of THE COLONEL’S NIECES, starring Brigitte Lahaie.

Jess Franco, who for years has been ridiculed as a cheap grunge director and yet in the end received the "Goya" award, the Spanish Oscar, made 17 films in this work period with Erwin C. Dietrich and called it the most productive and pleasant period of his career. Film such as Love Letters of a Portuguese Nun or Jack the Ripper with performances by Klaus Kinski were praised by industry friends and fans such as Joe Dante and Quentin Tarantino who once called Erwin the "Swiss Roger Corman".

The Story of Piera produced by him and directed by Marco Ferreri, starring Isabelle Huppert and Marcello Mastroianni, may not have been a commercially comparable success to Erwin's other productions but it turned into a huge hit at the festivals, and Hanna Schygulla received the "Golden Palm" in Cannes for her performance.

The action film The Wild Geese which he co-produced with Euan Lloyd garnered him international recognition. The cast included Richard Harris, Roger Moore, Richard Burton, and Hardy Krüger did its share; the movie was seen by 4 million movie-goers in Germany alone and advanced to become a huge blockbuster in 1978, ultimately winning the "Goldene Leinwand" award. Following this success Erwin launched similar additional big productions on the big screen, including Escape to Athena and The Sea Wolves. Convinced by their success Erwin began production along with business partner Peter Baumgartner (and Peter's dubbing studios in Berlin, "Cinephon") three action spectacles to be shot in the Philippines.

During that time he also opened up the first cinema-multiplex in Switzerland called "Capitol". Later he expanded it with the "Cinemax". In the beginning of the 1990s, after the dance film Dance Academy 2: Dance to Win, the two Swiss comedies Ein Schweizer Names Notzli and Der Doppelte Notzli, Deitrich retired from the active movie production business and committed himself to his movie distribution company "Ascot-Elite" which was taken over by his children.

Selected filmography

 1955: Das Mädchen vom Pfarrhof
 1957: The King of Bernina
 1959: The Model Husband
 1960: The Man in the Black Derby
 1961: 
 1961: 
 1962: Two Bavarians in Bonn
 1963: 
 1964: Coffin from Hong Kong
 1966: The Strangler of the Tower
 1966: Black Market of Love
 1967: 
 1967: Seitenstraße der Prostitution
 1968: 
 1968: 
 1968: Hinterhöfe der Liebe
 1968: 
 1969: Weisse Haut auf schwarzem Markt
 1969: Die Mühle der Jungfrauen
 1969: Die Nichten der Frau Oberst, 2. Teil – Mein Bett ist meine Burg
 1969: Nackter Norden
 1969: 
 1969: 
 1970: 
 1970: Porno Baby
 1970: The Ribald Tales of Robin Hood ( Robin Hood und seine lüsternen Mädchen)
 1970: Intimità proibite di una giovane sposa
 1970: La salamandra del deserto ( Tamar Wife of Er)
 1970: 
 1970:  ( Brand of Shame)
 1971: Die Sexabenteuer der drei Musketiere
 1971: 
 1971: 
 1971: 
 1972: The Young Seducers 2
 1972: Mädchen mit offenen Lippen
 1972: Die Mädchenhändler
 1972: Blutjunge Masseusen
 1972: The Calendar Girls
 1973: Bed Hostesses
 1973: Mädchen, die nach Liebe schreien
 1973: 
 1974: Der Teufel in Miss Jonas
 1974: Mädchen, die sich hocharbeiten
 1974: Frauen, die für Sex bezahlen
 1974: Heisser Sex in Bangkok
 1974: Die bumsfidelen Mädchen vom Birkenhof
 1975: Heisser Mund auf feuchten Lippen
 1975: Mädchen ohne Männer
 1975: Mädchen, die sich selbst bedienen
 1975: Rolls-Royce Baby
 1975: Was geschah wirklich mit Miss Jonas
 1976: Heisse Berührungen ( Midnight Party)
 1976: Mädchen, die am Wege liegen
 1976: Frauengefängnis ( Barbed Wire Dolls)
 1976: 
 1976: Mädchen im Nachtverkehr (Girls of the Night Shift)
 1976: Jack the Ripper
 1976: Die Marquise de Sade ( The Portrait of Doriana Gray)
 1977: Ilsa, the Wicked Warden ( Greta, the Mad Butcher)
 1977: Love Letters of a Portuguese Nun
 1977: Die Sklavinnen (The Slaves)
 1977: Nach Bangkok… der Liebe wegen
 1977: Tänzerinnen für Tanger
 1977: In 80 Betten um die Welt (Around the World in 80 Beds)
 1977: Weisse Haut auf schwarzen Schenkeln (White Skin, Black Thigh)
 1977:  ( Le Cabaret des filles perverses)
 1977:  ( Deux sœurs vicieuses)
 1977: Frauen im Liebeslager (Love Camp)
 1977: Ruf der blonden Göttin (The Call of the Blonde Goddess)
 1978: Frauen ohne Unschuld (Women Without Innocence)
 1978: Women in Cellblock 9
 1978: Mädchen nach Mitternacht
 1978: The Wild Geese
 1979: Sechs Schwedinnen im Pensionat
 1980: 
 1980: Gefangene Frauen
 1980: High Test Girls ( Sechs Schwedinnen von der Tankstelle)
 1980: Julchen und Jettchen
 1981: Mad Foxes
 1981: 
 1982: Ein lasterhafter Sommer
 1982: Heisser Sex auf Ibiza
 1982: Sechs Schwedinnen hinter Gittern (Ball Game)
 1983: The Story of Piera
 1983: Sechs Schwedinnen auf der Alm
 1984: The Future Is Woman
 1984: Code Name: Wild Geese
 1985: Commando Leopard
 1986: Operation Nam
 1988: 
 1988: Ein Schweizer namens Nötzli
 1989: Dance Academy II
 1990: Der doppelte Nötzli

Further reading

References

External links
Dietrich's web site

Erwin C. Dietrich: Switzerland is More Than Cheese Dossier - BCult

1930 births
2018 deaths
Swiss film directors
Swiss film producers
German-language film directors
People from Glarus